Pratik Gandhi is an Indian actor. He worked in Gujarati theatre before entering Gujarati cinema. He received wide acclaim for portraying Harshad Mehta in Sony LIV series Scam 1992. He acted in several Hindi films thereafter.

Early life
Gandhi was born in Surat to parents who were teachers. He completed his schooling at V. D. Desai Wadiwala (Bhulka Bhavan) High School in Surat. He studied at Surat where he was involved in theatre arts. He graduated in Industrial Engineering from the North Maharashtra University, Jalgaon in 2004. From 2004 to 2007, he worked with National Productivity Council in Satara and Pune. He later worked at Reliance Infrastructure (cement division) in Mumbai from January 2008 to 2016.

Acting career
Gandhi participated in the Gujarati play Aa Paar Ke Pele Paar. He played a role in the Gujarati film Bey Yaar (2014) and in plays Mere Piya Gaye Rangoon, Hu Chandrakant Bakshi and Ame Badha Sathe To Duniya Laiye Mathe. In Mohan's Masala, he performed a monologue in three languages, English, Hindi and Gujarati on the same day. He played a lead role in his next film, Wrong Side Raju (2016) which won the National Award for Best Gujarati Film. His next Gujarati films Love Ni Bhavai (2017) and Ventilator (2018) were commercially successful.

He played stockbroker Harshad Mehta in the 2020 Sony LIV biographical drama web series Scam 1992 directed by Hansal Mehta. He received wide acclaim for portraying Harshad Mehta.

Gandhi appeared in the 2021 Hindi film Bhavai where he played a lead. The film received mixed reviews. His next Hindi film was Atithi Bhooto Bhava was released in 2022. Gujarati film Vaahlam Jao Ne (2022) was his next release.

He will appear in Hindi film Dedh Bigha Zameen, written and directed by Pulkit. In July 2022, director Hansal Mehta announced a multi-season biographical web series on Mahatma Gandhi starring Pratik Gandhi in lead role.

Personal life
Gandhi's parents are teachers. He married actress Bhamini Oza in 2009 and their daughter Miraya was born in 2014.

Acting credits

Theater

Films

Web series

Awards

References

External links

Living people
Male actors in Hindi cinema
Male actors in Gujarati-language films
Indian male stage actors
Indian male film actors
21st-century Indian male actors
People from Surat
Gujarati people
People from Gujarat
Gujarati theatre
1980 births